The 2021 TCR Asia Series season was the sixth season of the TCR Asia Series, and first season of TCR Asia North Series, after the season of the previous year was canceled due to the coronavirus pandemic.

Teams and drivers

Calendar and results
The revised calendar was announced on 30 April 2021.

Championship standings

Drivers' championship

Scoring systems

Teams' championship

Footnotes

References

External links 
 

TCR Asia Series
Asia Series